Louis Wangberg (born  March 27, 1941) is an American educator who was the 41st lieutenant governor of Minnesota. He was elected on the Independent-Republican ticket with Governor Al Quie and served from January 1, 1979, to January 3, 1983. He also served as Quie's chief of staff for part of the term until he sought the governor's office on his own. In 1982, when Quie chose not to run for reelection, Wangberg was the Independent-Republican endorsed candidate for governor, but lost the primary to Wheelock Whitney. (DFL nominee Rudy Perpich won the election.)   

Wangberg first sought the congressional nomination for the Seventh District when Bob Bergland vacated the office to become Jimmy Carter's Secretary of Agriculture. He lost the primary to Arlan Stangeland. Before becoming lieutenant governor, Wangberg served as a school superintendent in Bemidji. After his term of office he was an executive with the Jostens Corporation, a management consultant, professional speaker, and the president of Flagler Career Institute. 

To date, Wangberg is the last male to serve as Minnesota's lieutenant governor. 

Wangberg lives in Oakland Park, Florida. He taught Advanced Placement American history and government/economics at Pembroke Pines Charter High School, the largest charter high school in the United States (1,700 students). He also served as a professor in the doctoral program at Northcentral University and the Keller Graduate School of Management.

References
Minnesota Historical Society

1941 births
Living people
People from Bemidji, Minnesota
American people of Swedish descent
Minnesota Republicans
Lieutenant Governors of Minnesota
People from Plantation, Florida